Bielin refers to the following places in Poland:

 Bielin, Lublin Voivodeship
 Bielin, West Pomeranian Voivodeship